Harry Alfred Jungbluth (Mons, Belgium, April 27, 1847 – Brussels, March 27, 1930) was a Belgian general, who was head of the military household of King Albert I between 1912 and 1930.

During World War I he was sidelined for political reasons, exiled to Le Havre, and represented King Albert in the Belgian government in exile.

References

1847 births
1930 deaths
Belgian generals